Engel is a German surname. Notable people with the surname include:

 Adam Engel (born 1991), American baseball player
 Albert J. Engel (1888–1959), American Representative from Michigan
 Albert J. Engel Jr. (1924–2013), American jurist
 Andreas K. Engel (born 1961), German neuroscientist
 Barbara Engel (born 1952), German fashion designer
 Carl Engel (1883–1944), French-born American composer
 Carl Engel (musicologist) (1818–1882), German-born English writer on music
 Carl Ludvig Engel (1778–1840), German-born Estonian/Finnish architect
 Charles Engel, American economist
 David Engel (actor), Broadway singer, dancer, and actor 
 David Engel (historian), American Holocaust historian
 David Hermann Engel (1816–1877), German organist and composer
 Eliot Engel, American Representative from New York
 Erich Engel (1891–1966), German actor
 Ernst Engel (1821–1896), German statistician
 Franz Engel (1834–1920), German explorer
 Friedrich Engel (mathematician) (1861–1941), German mathematician
 Friedrich Engel (SS officer) (1909–2006), German  officer
 Georgia Engel (1948–2019), American film and television actress
 Gerhard Engel (1906-1976), German Generalleutnant and State Commissioner of the Society for Military Customer
 Greg Engel (born 1971), American football player
 Johann Christian von Engel (1770–1814), Hungarian historian
 Karl Dietrich Leonhard Engel (1824–1913), German musician and writer
 Heinfried Engel (born 1947), German pole vaulter
 Howard Engel (born 1932), Canadian mystery writer and producer
 Jerzy Engel (born 1952), former Polish football manager
 Joel Engel (composer) (1868–1927), Russian-born Jewish composer
 Joel S. Engel (born 1936), American engineer and scientist
 Johann Jakob Engel (1741–1802), German philosophical writer
 Josef Engel (born 1942), Czech wrestler
 Josef Engel (anatomist) (1816–1899), German anatomist
 Jules Engel (1909–2003), American filmmaker, artist
 Julius Engel (1842–1926), German judge and politician
 Karl Engel (1923–2006), Swiss pianist
 Karl Engel (footballer) (born 1952), Swiss football goalkeeper
 Karl Dietrich Leonhard Engel (1824–1913), German composer and writer
 L. Patrick Engel (1032-2022), American politician
 Lehman Engel (1910–1982), American composer and conductor
 Marian Engel (1933–1985), Canadian novelist
 Maro Engel (born 1985), German auto racing driver
 Matthew Engel (born 1951), English writer, especially on cricket
 Michael S. Engel (born 1971), US paleontologist and entomologist
 Natascha Engel (born 1967), former British Member of Parliament
 Pál Engel (1938–2001), Hungarian historian
 Pascal Engel, (born 1954), French philosopher
 Dame Pauline Engel (1930–2017), New Zealand nun and educator
 Richard Engel (born 1973), American television journalist and author
 Roy Engel (1913-1980), American actor.
 Royan Engel (born 1943/1944), American businesswoman.
 S. Morris Engel (born 1931), author, philosopher, and linguist
 Scott Walker (singer) (1943–2019), American-born British singer and musician born Noel Scott Engel
 Stephen Engel (fl. 1990s–2010s), American TV producer and writer
 Stephen M. Engel (fl. 1990s–2010s), American academic and political scientist
 Steve Engel (born 1961), American baseball player
 Steven Engel (born 1974), American lawyer and former Justice Department official
 Volker Engel (born 1965), German-born American visual effects artist

See also
Admiral Engel (disambiguation)
Senator Engel (disambiguation)
Engels (surname)
Engle (surname)

German-language surnames
Ethnonymic surnames